The gray-barred wren (Campylorhynchus megalopterus) is a species of bird in the family Troglodytidae. It is endemic to Mexico.

Taxonomy and systematics

The gray-barred wren has two subspecies, the nominate Campylorhynchus megalopterus megalopterus and C. m. nelsoni. The latter has been suggested as a separate species but there are only small differences between the subspecies in size and plumage and no apparent differences in their voices.

Description

Both sexes of the nominate have a grayish crown with a black center, a black and white striped nape, and black shoulders and back barred with white. Their throat and chest are white with black spots and the flanks buff with blackish bars. C. m. nelsoni is the smaller of the subspecies and its underparts' spots and bars are grayish brown. The juvenile has a solid brown cap and is buff and brownish overall with no bars on the back and no spots on the chest.

Distribution and habitat

The ranges of the two subspecies of gray-barred wren do not meet. The nominate is found in the Trans-Mexican Volcanic Belt from Jalisco and Michoacán east to western Puebla. C. m. nelsoni is found in the southern Sierra Madre Oriental from west-central Veracruz through eastern Puebla into northern Oaxaca. It inhabits several types of montane forest including humid pine-oak and stands of Abies fir. It occurs in both primary and secondary forest.

Behavior

Feeding

Though the gray-barred wren's diet has not been documented, it is probably small invertebrates. It does not forage on the ground but probes epiphytes, mosses, and lichens.

Breeding

The gray-barred wren's breeding season appears to be May to June. Its nest is a domed structure with a side entrance constructed of moss and placed high in a tree. Little else is known about the species' breeding phenology.

Vocalization

The gray-barred wren's song is "a rapid harsh chatter" ; both sexes sing in duet. Its call is "a harsh 'karrr'" .

Status

The IUCN has assessed the gray-barred wren as being of Least Concern. It is "common in many areas of suitable habitat" and "[appears] able to tolerate some modification of habitat."

References

gray-barred Wren
Endemic birds of Mexico
gray-barred wren
Taxonomy articles created by Polbot
Birds of the Trans-Mexican Volcanic Belt
Fauna of the Sierra Madre de Oaxaca